Xanthorhoe frigida is a species of moth in the family Geometridae. It is endemic to New Zealand. The larvae of this species feeds on species in the plant genus Pachycladon including the threatened Pachycladon wallii. The adults of this species are on the wing from December to February. This moth is classified as nationally vulnerable by the Department of Conservation.

Taxonomy 
Xanthorhoe frigida was first described by George Howes in 1946 using a specimen collected by T. M. Smith at Homer in December 1944. The holotype specimen is held at Museum of New Zealand Te Papa Tongarewa.

Description 
Howes described the species as follows:

Distribution and habitat 
This species is endemic to New Zealand. This species can be found in Mackenzie, Central Otago, Otago Lakes and Fiordland areas. This species prefers subalpine/alpine habitat. As at 2000 this species was only known from 5 localities. Other than its type locality, the species has more recently been collected at Rastus Burn Basin, The Remarkables in December and February, the Eyre Ecological District, northern Southland, and in the alpine zone of the Ben Nevis Pastoral lease area, Central Otago.

Host plants 

This species feeds on Pachycladon species. A host plant of this species is the at risk and naturally uncommon Pachycladon wallii.

Conservation status 
This species has the "Nationally Vulnerable" conservation status under the New Zealand Threat Classification System.

References

External links 

Image of holotype specimen.

frigida
Moths of New Zealand
Endemic fauna of New Zealand
Moths described in 1946
Endangered biota of New Zealand
Taxa named by George Howes (entomologist)
Endemic moths of New Zealand